Child's Play (stylized as Child'ƨ Play) was an American rock band from Baltimore, Maryland. The group was formed in 1983 with Larry Hinshaw on vocals, Brian Jack on guitar, Phil Wiser on bass, Jimmy Shafer on guitar, and Steve Albinak on drums. The group later replaced Steve Albinak with John Allen on drums and added Nicky Kay as another guitar player, with this lineup recording their first EP, Ruff House, in 1986. 

The band's lineup changed in 1987, with the addition of Idzi on bass and Brian Jack now performing vocals. They signed to Chrysalis Records in 1989. Their major label debut album, Rat Race, produced by Howard Benson, was released the following year. In 1990 they toured the United States, opening for Cold Sweat. 

On April 17, 2012,  Brian Jack died. A memorial page on Facebook was started to honor him.

Band members
Former members
Larry "L.H." Hinshaw – lead vocals (1983–1988, 2013, 2015)
Brian Jack – lead and rhythm guitar, backing vocals (1983–1988); lead vocals, lead and rhythm guitar (1988–1991, 2003–2005, 2011–2012)
Phil Wiser – bass guitar, backing vocals (1983–1987)
Jimmy Shafer – lead and rhythm guitar (1983–1984)
Chad Channing – drums (1983)
Steve Albinak – drums (1983–1984)
John Allen – drums, backing and lead vocals (1984–1995, 2003–2005, 2011–2012, 2013, 2015)
Nicky Kay – lead and rhythm guitar, backing vocals (1984–1995, 2003–2005, 2011–2012, 2013, 2015)
Idzi – bass guitar, backing vocals (1987–1995, 2003–2005, 2011–2012, 2013, 2015)
Tommy McRae – lead vocals, rhythm guitar (1991–1995)
Ty Cook

Timeline

Discography

Extended plays
Ruff House (1986)

Studio albums
Rat Race (1990)
Long Way (1993)

See also
List of glam metal bands and artists

References

External links
 Official Site (archive)
MusicMight site
R.I.P. Brian Jack Memorial Page on Facebook

1983 establishments in Maryland
1995 disestablishments in Maryland
Glam metal musical groups from Maryland
Hard rock musical groups from Maryland
Heavy metal musical groups from Maryland
Musical groups established in 1983
Musical groups disestablished in 1995